Diema Sport is a Bulgarian paid sports television channel, part of Nova Broadcasting Group, owned by United Group. It is part of Diema Extra premium sport package, which also includes the channels Diema Sport 2, Diema Sport 3 and Trace Sports Stars HD. The channel broadcasts premium live sports events such as the Bulgarian A Football Group, Premier League. The channel also features magazine sports shows, commentator sports studios and talk shows.

Diema Extra
Diema Extra was a Bulgarian premium paid channel which launched in January 2005. It aired films and other series, as well as sports events mostly from the English and Spanish Football Leagues. Later, most of these programs were moved to the other Diema Vision channels, as few people signed up for the service, and advertising proved more profitable. In September 2007 Diema Extra was finally closed after Diema Vision was sold to Apace Media. 

On 21 February 2015 Diema Extra was relaunched as a premium sport package, initially containing the channels Diema Sport and Trace Sports Stars HD. On 8 August 2015, Diema Sport 2 was launched, followed by Diema Sport 3 on 1 July 2021.

Logos 

Television networks in Bulgaria
Bulgarian-language television stations
Modern Times Group
Television channels and stations established in 1999
1999 establishments in Bulgaria